"Almost Home" is a song co-written and recorded by American country music singer Mary Chapin Carpenter. It was released in April 1999 as the first single from her compilation album, Party Doll and Other Favorites. It peaked at number 22 on the Billboard Hot Country Songs chart, and is her last Top 40 country hit.

Content
The song is a mid-tempo about a woman who "takes stock of a life lived and comes up short". It is in the key of B-flat major with an approximate tempo of 96 beats per minute and a chord pattern of F-B-E-B. Carpenter wrote the song with Beth Nielsen Chapman and Annie Roboff, and produced it with Blake Chancey.

Critical reception
Deborah Evans Price of Billboard reviewed the single with favor, saying that "it's a vibrant musical outing that could signal a return to prominence for this talented singer/songwriter. Carpenter's evocative vocals infuse any song with passion and integrity, and she's particularly effective on this poignant lyric." Alanna Nash of Entertainment Weekly also described the song favorably in her review of the album, saying that it "scores the highest at marrying lyrical introspection and rhythmic yearning, one of the benchmarks of her graceful, if circuitous, career."

Personnel
From Party Doll and Other Favorites liner notes.

 Ava Aldridge - background vocals
 Pat Buchanan - electric guitar
 Mary Chapin Carpenter - acoustic guitar, vocals
 Jon Carroll - background vocals
 Beth Nielsen Chapman - background vocals
 John Jennings - acoustic guitar, background vocals
 Duke Levine - electric guitar
 Greg Morrow - drums
 Michael Rhodes - bass guitar
 Tom Roady - percussion
 Annie Roboff - background vocals
 Matt Rollings - piano, organ
 Cindy Walker - background vocals
 Reggie Young - electric guitar

Chart performance

References

1999 songs
1999 singles
Columbia Records singles
Mary Chapin Carpenter songs
Songs written by Mary Chapin Carpenter
Songs written by Beth Nielsen Chapman
Songs written by Annie Roboff
Song recordings produced by Blake Chancey